Popular Woodworking is a woodworking magazine published by Cruz Bay Publishing an arm of Active Interest Media.

History and profile
The magazine's focus is a combination of hand tool and power tool woodworking including many how-to projects.

The magazine underwent many changes in ownership, most recently as a result of the bankruptcy of F+W Media where they got sold to Cruz Bay Publishing and Active Interest Media.

Notable contributors
 Roy Underhill
 Christopher Schwarz
 Mary May

References

External links
 

Hobby magazines published in the United States
Monthly magazines published in the United States
Woodworking magazines
Arts and crafts magazines